The 1950s (pronounced nineteen-fifties; commonly abbreviated as the "Fifties" or the "50s") (among other variants) was a decade that began on January 1, 1950, and ended on December 31, 1959.

Throughout the decade, the world continued its recovery from World War II, aided by the post-World War II economic expansion. The period also saw great population growth with increased birth rates and the emergence of the baby boomer generation. Despite this recovery, the Cold War developed from its modest beginnings in the late 1940s to a heated competition between the Soviet Union and the United States by the early 1960s. The ideological clash between communism and capitalism dominated the decade, especially in the Northern Hemisphere, with conflicts including the Korean War in the early 1950s, the Cuban Revolution, the beginning of the Vietnam War in French Indochina, and the beginning of the Space Race with the launch of Sputnik 1 in 1957. Along with increased testing of nuclear weapons (such as RDS-37 and Upshot–Knothole), the tense geopolitical situation created a politically conservative climate. In the United States, a wave of anti-communist sentiment known as the Second Red Scare resulted in Congressional hearings by both houses in Congress. The beginning of decolonization in Africa and Asia also took place in this decade and accelerated in the following decade. During the 1950s, the world population increased from 2.5 to 3.0 billion, with approximately 1 billion births and 500 million deaths.

Politics and wars

Wars

 Cold War conflicts involving the influence of the rival superpowers of the Soviet Union and the United States
 Korean War (1950–1953) – The war, which lasted from June 25, 1950, until the signing of the Korean Armistice Agreement on July 27, 1953, started as a civil war between North Korea and the Republic of Korea (South Korea). When it began, North and South Korea existed as provisional governments competing for control over the Korean peninsula, due to the division of Korea by outside powers. While originally a civil war, it quickly escalated into a war between the Western powers under the United Nations Command led by the United States and its allies and the communist powers of the People's Republic of China and the Soviet Union. On September 15, General Douglas MacArthur conducted Operation Chromite, an amphibious landing at the city of Inchon (Song Do port). The North Korean army collapsed, and within a few days, MacArthur's army retook Seoul (South Korea's capital). He then pushed north, capturing Pyongyang in October. Chinese intervention the following month drove UN forces south again. MacArthur then planned for a full-scale invasion of China, but this was against the wishes of President Truman and others who wanted a limited war. He was dismissed and replaced by General Matthew Ridgeway. The war then became a bloody stalemate for the next two and a half years while peace negotiations dragged on. The war left 33,742 American soldiers dead, 92,134 wounded, and 80,000 missing in action (MIA) or prisoner of war (POW). Estimates place Korean and Chinese casualties at 1,000,000–1,400,000 dead or wounded, and 140,000 MIA or POW.
 The Vietnam War began in 1955. Diệm instituted a policy of death penalty against any communist activity in 1956. The Viet Minh began an assassination campaign in early 1957. An article by French scholar Bernard Fall published in July 1958 concluded that a new war had begun. The first official large unit military action was on September 26, 1959, when the Viet Cong ambushed two ARVN companies.
 Arab–Israeli conflict (from the early 20th century)

 Suez Crisis (1956) – The Suez Crisis was a war fought on Egyptian territory in 1956. Following the nationalisation of the Suez Canal in 1956 by Gamal Abdel Nasser, the United Kingdom, France and Israel subsequently invaded. The operation was a military success, but after the United States and Soviet Union united in opposition to the invasion, the invaders were forced to withdraw. This was seen as a major humiliation, especially for the two Western European countries, and symbolizes the beginning of the end of colonialism and the weakening of European global importance, specifically the collapse of the British Empire.
 Algerian War (1954–1962) – An important decolonization war, it was a complex conflict characterized by guerrilla warfare, maquis fighting, terrorism against civilians, use of torture on both sides and counter-terrorism operations by the French Army. The war eventually led to the independence of Algeria from France.

Internal conflicts 

 Cuban Revolution (1953–1959) – The 1959 overthrow of Fulgencio Batista by Fidel Castro, Che Guevara and other forces resulted in the creation of the first communist government in the Western hemisphere.
 The Mau Mau began retaliating against the British in Kenya. This led to concentration camps in Kenya, a British military victory, and the election of moderate nationalist Jomo Kenyatta as leader of Kenya.
 The wind of destruction began in Rwanda in 1959 following the assault of Hutu politician Dominique Mbonyumutwa by Tutsi forces. This was the beginning of decades of ethnic violence in the country, which culminated in the 1994 Rwandan Genocide.
 Hungarian Revolution of 1956 – A massive, spontaneous popular uprising in the Soviet satellite state of Hungary against that country's Soviet-backed Marxist-Leninist regime, inspired by political changes in Poland and the Soviet Union.  The uprising, fought primarily by students and workers, managed to fight the invading Soviet Army to a standstill, and a new, pro-reform government took power.  While the top Soviet leaders even considered withdrawing from Hungary entirely, they soon crushed the Revolution with a massive second invasion, killing thousands of Hungarians and sending hundreds of thousands more into exile.  This was the largest act of internal dissent in the history of the Soviet Bloc, and its violent suppression served to further discredit the Soviet Union even among its erstwhile supporters.
 1951 Nepalese revolution (Sat Salko Kranti) – The overthrow of the autocratic Rana regime in Nepal and the establishment of democracy in Nepal.

Coups 

Prominent coups d'état of the decade included:

 Egyptian revolution of 1952: A group of army officers led by Mohammed Naguib and Gamal Abdel Nasser overthrew King Farouk and the Muhammad Ali Dynasty in July 1952.
 On March 10, 1952, Fulgencio Batista led a bloodless coup to topple the democratically elected government in Cuba.
 1953 Iranian coup d'état: In August 1953, a coup jointly led by the United States and United Kingdom and codenamed Operation Ajax, overthrew Prime Minister Mohammed Mosaddeq.
 1953 Pakistani constitutional coup: Governor-General Ghulam Mohammad, supported by Field Marshal Ayub Khan, dismissed the prime minister and dissolved the Constituent Assembly.
 1954 Guatemalan coup d'état: The democratically elected government of Colonel Jacobo Arbenz Guzmán was ousted by Colonel Carlos Castillo Armas in an operation organized by the American Central Intelligence Agency.
 The 1954 Paraguayan coup brings Alfredo Stroessner to power.
 14 July Revolution in Iraq: The Hashemite monarchy was overthrown and the Iraqi Republic was established, with Abd al-Karim Qasim as Prime Minister.
 May 1958 crisis in France: General Jacques Massu took over Algiers and threatened to invade Paris unless Charles de Gaulle became head of state.

Decolonization and independence 
 Decolonization of former European Colonial empires. The French Fourth Republic in particular faced conflict on two fronts within the French Union, the Algerian War and the First Indochina War. The Federation of Malaya peacefully gained independence from the United Kingdom in 1957. French rule ended in Algeria in 1958, Vietnam left French Indochina in 1954. The rival states of North Vietnam and South Vietnam were formed. Cambodia and the Kingdom of Laos also gained independence, effectively ending French presence in Southeast Asia. Elsewhere the Belgian Congo and other African nations gained their independence from France, Belgium and the United Kingdom.
 Large-scale decolonization in Africa first began in the 1950s. In 1951, Libya became the first African country to gain independence in the decade, and in 1954 the Algerian War began. 1956 saw Sudan, Morocco, and Tunisia become independent, and the next year Ghana became the first sub-saharan African nation to gain independence.

Prominent political events 
 European Common Market – The European Communities (or Common Markets), the precursor of the European Union, was established with the Treaty of Rome in 1957.
 On November 1, 1950, two Puerto Rican nationalists staged an attempted assassination on U.S. President Harry S. Truman. The leader of the team Griselio Torresola had firearm experience and Oscar Collazo was his accomplice. They made their assault at the Blair House where President Truman and his family were staying. Torresola mortally wounded a White House policeman, Leslie Coffelt, who shot Torresola dead before expiring himself. Collazo, as a co-conspirator in a felony that turned into a homicide, was found guilty of murder and was sentenced to death in 1952 but then his sentence was later commuted to life in prison.
 On July 7, 1950, the first Group Areas Act was promulgated by the Parliament of South Africa and implemented over a period of several years. The passing of the Act contributed significantly to the period of institutionalised racial segregation and discrimination in South Africa known as Apartheid, which lasted from 1948 to 1991. One of the most famous uses of the Group Areas Act was the destruction of Sophiatown, a suburb of Johannesburg, which began on the 9th of February 1955.
 Establishment of the Non-Aligned Movement, through the Bandung Conference of 1955, consisting of nations not formally aligned with or against any major power bloc.

Asia 
 The U.S. ended its occupation of Japan, which became fully independent. Japan held democratic elections and recovered economically.
 Within a year of its establishment, the People's Republic of China had reclaimed Tibet and intervened in the Korean War, causing years of hostility and estrangement from the United States. Mao admired Stalin and rejected the changes in Moscow after Stalin's death in 1953, leading to growing tension with the Soviet Union.
 In 1950–1953 France tried to contain a growing communist insurgency led by Ho Chi Minh. After their defeat in the Battle of Dien Bien Phu in 1954 France granted independence to the nations of Cambodia, Laos and Vietnam. At the Geneva Conference of 1954 France and the Communists agreed to divide Vietnam and hold elections in 1956. The U.S. and South Vietnam rejected the Geneva accords and the division became permanent.
 The Chinese Civil War, which had started officially in 1927 and continued until the Second World War had ended on May 7, 1950. It resulted in the previous incumbent government in China, the Republic of China, retreating to the islands of Taiwan and Hainan until the Landing Operation on Hainan Island.

Africa 
 Africa experienced the beginning of large-scale top-down economic interventions in the 1950s that failed to cause improvement and led to charitable exhaustion by the West as the century went on. The widespread corruption was not dealt with and war, disease, and famine continued to be constant problems in the region.
 Egyptian general Gamel Abdel Nasser overthrew the Egyptian monarchy, establishing himself as President of Egypt. Nasser became an influential leader in the Middle East in the 1950s, leading Arab states into war with Israel, becoming a major leader of the Non-Aligned Movement and promoting pan-Arab unification.
 In 1957, Dr. Kwame Nkrumah, after a series of negotiations with the then British empire, secured the independence of Ghana. Ghana was hitherto referred to as Gold Coast, a colony of the British Empire.

Americas 

 In 1950, Greenland (27 May) became a Colony of the Kingdom of Denmark. North Greenland and South Greenland were united with one governor. 
 In 1953, Greenland (5 June) was made an equal and integral part of Denmark as an amt.
 In 1954, the CIA orchestrated the overthrow of the Guatemalan government of Jacobo Arbenz and installed Carlos Castillo Armas.
 In 1957, Dr. François Duvalier came to power in an election in Haiti. He later declared himself president for life, and ruled until his death in 1971.
In 1958, the military dictatorship of Venezuela was overthrown.
 In 1959, Alaska (3 January) and Hawaii (21 August) became the 49th and 50th states respectively of the United States.
 In 1959, Fidel Castro overthrew the regime of Fulgencio Batista in Cuba, establishing a communist government in the country. Although Castro initially sought aid from the US, he was rebuffed and later turned to the Soviet Union.
 NORAD signed in 1959 by Canada and the United States creating a unified North American air defense system.
 Brasília was built in 41 months, from 1956, and on April 21, 1960, became the capital of Brazil

Europe 
 With the help of the Marshall Plan, post-war reconstruction succeeded, with some countries (including West Germany) adopting free market capitalism while others adopted Keynesian-policy welfare states. Europe continued to be divided into Western and Soviet bloc countries. The geographical point of this division came to be called the Iron Curtain.
 Because previous attempts for a unified state failed, Germany remained divided into two states: the capitalist Federal Republic of Germany in the west and the socialist German Democratic Republic in the east. The Federal Republic identified itself as the legal successor to the fascist dictatorship and was obliged in paying war reparations. The GDR, however, denounced the fascist past completely and did not recognize itself as responsible for paying reparations on behalf of the Nazi regime. The GDR's more harsh attitude in suppressing anti-communist and Russophobic sentiment lingering in the post-Nazi society resulted in increased emigration to the west.
 While the United States military maintained its bases in western Europe, the Soviet Union maintained its bases in the east. In 1953, Joseph Stalin, the leader of the Soviet Union, died. This led to the rise of Nikita Khrushchev, who denounced Stalin and pursued a more liberal domestic and foreign policy, stressing peaceful competition with the West rather than overt hostility. There were anti-Stalinist uprisings in East Germany and Poland in 1953 and Hungary in 1956.

Disasters 

Natural:
 On August 15, 1950, the 8.6  Assam–Tibet earthquake shakes the region with a maximum Mercalli intensity of XI (Extreme), killing between 1,500 and 3,300 people.
 On January 18, 1951, Mount Lamington erupted in Papua New Guinea, killing 3,000 people.
 On January 31, 1953, the North Sea flood of 1953 killed 1,835 people in the southwestern Netherlands (especially Zeeland) and 307 in the United Kingdom
 On September 9, 1954, the 6.7  Chlef earthquake shakes northern Algeria with a maximum Mercalli intensity of XI (Extreme). The shock destroyed Orléansville, left 1,243–1,409 dead, and 5,000 injured.
 On October 11, 1954, Hurricane Hazel crossed over Haiti, killing 1,000.
 On August 19, 1955, Hurricane Diane hit the northeastern United States, killing over 200 people, and causing over $1.0 billion in damage.
 On June 27, 1957, Hurricane Audrey demolished Cameron, Louisiana, US, killing 400 people.
 In April 1959, the Río Negro flooded central Uruguay.
 Typhoon Vera hit central Honshū on September 26, 1959, killing an estimated 5,098, injuring another 38,921, and leaving 1,533,000 homeless. Most of the damage was centered in the Nagoya area.
 On December 2, 1959, Malpasset Dam in southern France collapsed and water flowed over the town of Fréjus, killing 412.

Non-natural:
 On March 12, 1950, an Avro Tudor plane carrying a rugby team crashed in Wales, killing 80 people.
In early December 1952, the Great Smog of London caused major disruption by reducing visibility and even penetrating indoor areas, far more severely than previous smog events, called "pea-soupers". Government medical reports in the weeks following the event estimated that up to 4,000 people had died as a direct result of the smog and 100,000 more were made ill by the smog's effects on the human respiratory tract. 
 On June 18, 1953, a USAF Douglas C-124 Globemaster II crashed after takeoff from Tachikawa, Japan, killing all 129 on board.
 On January 10, 1954, BOAC Flight 781, a new de Havilland Comet jetliner, disintegrated in mid-air due to structural failure and crashed off the Italian coast, killing all 35 on board.
 On June 30, 1956, a United Airlines Douglas DC-7 and a Trans World Airlines Lockheed L-1049 Super Constellation collided above the Grand Canyon in Arizona, killing all 128 people on board both aircraft.
 On July 25, 1956, the Italian ocean liner  collided with the Swedish ocean liner MS Stockholm off the Nantucket, Massachusetts, coastline. 51 people were killed and the Andrea Doria sank the next morning.
 On February 6, 1958, British European Airways Flight 609 crashed on its third attempt to take off from a slush-covered runway at Munich-Riem Airport in Munich, West Germany. 23 people on board were killed (including 8 players of the Manchester United F.C. soccer team).
 On April 21, 1958, a mid-air collision between United Airlines Flight 736 and a USAF fighter jet killed 49 people.
 On August 14, 1958, a KLM Lockheed Constellation crashed into the Atlantic Ocean off the coast of Ireland, killing all 99 people aboard.

Economics 
 The United States was the most influential economic power in the world after World War II under the presidency of Dwight D. Eisenhower.

Inflation was moderate during the decade of the 1950s. The first few months had a deflationary hangover from the 1940s but the first full year ended with what looked like the beginnings of massive inflation with annual inflation rates ranging from 8% to 9% a year. By 1952 inflation subsided. 1954 and 1955 flirted with deflation again but the remainder of the decade had moderate inflation ranging from 1% to 3.7%. The average annual inflation for the entire decade was only 2.04%.

Assassinations and attempts
Prominent assassinations, targeted killings, and assassination attempts include:

Science and technology

Technology 

The recently invented bipolar transistor, though initially quite feeble, had clear potential and was rapidly improved and developed at the beginning of the 1950s by companies such as GE, RCA, and Philco. The first commercial transistor production started at the Western Electric plant in Allentown, Pennsylvania, in October, 1951 with the point contact germanium transistor. It wasn't until around 1954 that transistor products began to achieve real commercial success with small portable radios.

A breakthrough in semiconductor technology came with the invention of the MOSFET (metal–oxide–semiconductor field-effect transistor), also known as the MOS transistor, by Mohamed Atalla and Dawon Kahng at Bell Labs, in November 1959. It revolutionized the electronics industry, and became the fundamental building block of the Digital Revolution. The MOSFET went on to become the most widely manufactured device in history.

Television, which first reached the marketplace in the 1940s, attained maturity during the 1950s and by the end of the decade, most American households owned a TV set. A rush to produce larger screens than the tiny ones found on 1940s models occurred during 1950–52. In 1954, RCA intro Bell Telephone Labs produced the first Solar battery. In 1954, a yard of contact paper could be purchased for only 59 cents. Polypropylene was invented in 1954. In 1955, Jonas Salk invented a polio vaccine which was given to more than seven million American students. In 1956, a solar powered wrist watch was invented.

A surprise came in 1957: a  satellite named Sputnik 1 was launched by the Soviets. The space race began 4 months later as the United States launched a smaller satellite.

 Charles H. Townes builds the Maser in 1953 at the Columbia University.
 The Soviet Union launches Sputnik 1, the first artificial satellite to orbit the earth on October 4, 1957.
 The United States conducts its first hydrogen bomb explosion test.
 The invention of the modern Solar cell.
 The first Passenger jets enter service.
 The U.S. uses Federal prisons, mental institutions and pharmacological testing volunteers to test drugs like LSD and chlorpromazine. Also started experimenting with the transorbital lobotomy.
 President Harry S. Truman inaugurated transcontinental television service on September 4, 1951, when he made a speech to the nation. AT&T carried his address from San Francisco and it was viewed from the west coast to the east coast at the same time.

Science 

 Francis Crick and James Watson discover the double-helix structure of DNA. Rosalind Franklin contributed to the discovery of the double-helix structure.
 An immunization vaccine is produced for polio.
 The first successful ultrasound test of the heart activity.
 CERN is established.
 The world's first nuclear power plant is opened in Obninsk near Moscow.
 NASA is organized.
 The first human cervical cancer cells were cultured outside a body in 1951, from Henrietta Lacks. The cells are known as HeLa cells and are the first and most commonly used immortalised cell line.
 First transistor computer, built at the University of Manchester in November 1953.

Popular culture 
The most prominent events and trends in popular culture of the decade (particularly in the Anglosphere) include:

Music

Popular music in the early 1950s was essentially a continuation of the crooner sound of the previous decade, with less emphasis on the jazz-influenced big band style and more emphasis on a conservative, operatic, symphonic style of music. Frank Sinatra, Tony Bennett, Frankie Laine, Patti Page, Judy Garland, Johnnie Ray, Kay Starr, Perry Como, Bing Crosby, Rosemary Clooney, Dean Martin, Georgia Gibbs, Eddie Fisher, Teresa Brewer, Dinah Shore, Kitty Kallen, Joni James, Peggy Lee, Julie London, Toni Arden, June Valli, Doris Day, Arthur Godfrey, Tennessee Ernie Ford, Guy Mitchell, Nat King Cole, and vocal groups like the Mills Brothers, The Ink Spots, The Four Lads, The Four Aces, The Chordettes, The Fontane Sisters, The Hilltoppers and the Ames Brothers. Jo Stafford's "You Belong To Me" was the #1 song of 1952 on the Billboard Top 100 chart.

The middle of the decade saw a change in the popular music landscape as classic pop was swept off the charts by rock-and-roll. Crooners such as Eddie Fisher, Perry Como, and Patti Page, who had dominated the first half of the decade, found their access to the pop charts significantly curtailed by the decade's end.
doo-wop entered the pop charts in the 1950s. Its popularity soon spawns the parody "Who Put the Bomp".

Rock-n-roll emerged in the mid-1950s with Sam Cooke, Elvis Presley, Jackie Wilson, Gene Vincent, Chuck Berry, Fats Domino, Little Richard, James Brown, Bo Diddley, Buddy Holly, Bobby Darin, Ritchie Valens, Duane Eddy, Eddie Cochran, Brenda Lee, Bobby Vee, Connie Francis, Johnny Mathis, Neil Sedaka, Pat Boone and Ricky Nelson being notable exponents. In the mid-1950s, Elvis Presley became the leading figure of the newly popular sound of rock and roll with a series of network television appearances and chart-topping records. Chuck Berry, with "Maybellene" (1955), "Roll Over Beethoven" (1956), "Rock and Roll Music" (1957) and "Johnny B. Goode" (1958), refined and developed the major elements that made rock and roll distinctive, focusing on teen life and introducing guitar solos and showmanship that would be a major influence on subsequent rock music. Bill Haley, Elvis Presley, Jerry Lee Lewis, The Everly Brothers, Carl Perkins, Johnny Cash, Conway Twitty, Johnny Horton, and Marty Robbins were Rockabilly musicians. Doo-wop was another popular genre at the time. Popular Doo Wop and Rock-n-Roll bands of the mid to late 1950s include The Platters, The Flamingos, The Dells, The Silhouettes, Frankie Lymon and The Teenagers, Little Anthony and The Imperials, Danny & the Juniors, The Coasters, The Drifters, The Del-Vikings and Dion and the Belmonts.

The new music differed from previous styles in that it was primarily targeted at the teenager market, which became a distinct entity for the first time in the 1950s as growing prosperity meant that young people did not have to grow up as quickly or be expected to support a family. Rock-and-roll proved to be a difficult phenomenon for older Americans to accept and there were widespread accusations of it being a communist-orchestrated scheme to corrupt the youth, although rock and roll was extremely market based and capitalistic.

Jazz stars in the 1950s who came into prominence in their genres called bebop, hard bop, cool jazz and the blues, at this time included Lester Young, Ben Webster, Charlie Parker, Dizzy Gillespie, Miles Davis, John Coltrane, Thelonious Monk, Charles Mingus, Art Tatum, Bill Evans, Ahmad Jamal, Oscar Peterson, Gil Evans, Jerry Mulligan, Cannonball Adderley, Stan Getz, Chet Baker, Dave Brubeck, Art Blakey, Max Roach, the Miles Davis Quintet, the Modern Jazz Quartet, Ella Fitzgerald, Ray Charles, Sarah Vaughan, Dinah Washington, Nina Simone, and Billie Holiday.

The American folk music revival became a phenomenon in the United States in the 1950s to mid-1960s with the initial success of The Weavers who popularized the genre. Their sound, and their broad repertoire of traditional folk material and topical songs inspired other groups such as the Kingston Trio, the Chad Mitchell Trio, The New Christy Minstrels, and the "collegiate folk" groups such as The Brothers Four, The Four Freshmen, The Four Preps, and The Highwaymen. All featured tight vocal harmonies and a repertoire at least initially rooted in folk music and topical songs.

On 3 February 1959, a chartered plane transporting the three American rock and roll musicians Buddy Holly, Ritchie Valens and J. P. "The Big Bopper" Richardson goes down in foggy conditions near Clear Lake, Iowa, killing all four occupants on board, including pilot Roger Peterson. The tragedy is later termed "The Day the Music Died", popularized in Don McLean's 1972 song "American Pie". This event, combined with the conscription of Elvis Presley into the US Army, is often taken to mark the point where the era of 1950s rock-and-roll ended.

Television 

The 1950s are known as the Golden Age of Television by some people. Sales of TV sets rose tremendously in the 1950s and by 1950 4.4 million families in America had a television set. Americans devoted most of their free time to watching television broadcasts. People spent so much time watching TV, that movie attendance dropped and so did the number of radio listeners. Television revolutionized the way Americans see themselves and the world around them. TV affects all aspects of American culture. "Television affects what we wear, the music we listen to, what we eat, and the news we receive."

Film 

European cinema experienced a renaissance in the 1950s following the deprivations of World War II. Italian director Federico Fellini won the first foreign language film Academy Award with La Strada and garnered another Academy Award with Nights of Cabiria. In 1955, Swedish director Ingmar Bergman earned a Jury Prize at the Cannes Film Festival with Smiles of a Summer Night and followed the film with masterpieces The Seventh Seal and Wild Strawberries. Jean Cocteau's Orphée, a film central to his Orphic Trilogy, starred Jean Marais and was released in 1950. French director Claude Chabrol's Le Beau Serge is now widely considered the first film of the French New Wave. Notable European film stars of the period include Brigitte Bardot, Sophia Loren, Marcello Mastroianni, Max von Sydow, and Jean-Paul Belmondo.

Japanese cinema reached its zenith with films from director Akira Kurosawa including Rashomon, Ikiru, Seven Samurai, Throne of Blood, and The Hidden Fortress. Other distinguished Japanese directors of the period were Yasujirō Ozu and Kenji Mizoguchi. Russian fantasy director Aleksandr Ptushko's mythological epics Sadko, Ilya Muromets, and Sampo were internationally acclaimed as was Ballad of a Soldier, a 1959 Soviet film directed by Grigory Chukhray.

In Hollywood, the epic Ben-Hur grabbed a record 11 Academy Awards in 1959 and its success gave a new lease of life to motion picture studio MGM.

Beginning in 1953, with Shane and The Robe, widescreen motion pictures became the norm.

The "Golden Era" of 3D cinematography transpired during the 1950s.

Animated films in the 1950s presented by Walt Disney included Cinderella, Alice in Wonderland, Peter Pan and Lady and the Tramp, followed by Sleeping Beauty.

Art movements 
In the early 1950s abstract expressionism and artists Jackson Pollock and Willem de Kooning were enormously influential. However, by the late 1950s Color Field painting and Barnett Newman and Mark Rothko's paintings became more in focus to the next generation.

Pop art used the iconography of television, photography, comics, cinema and advertising. With its roots in dadaism, it started to take form towards the end of the 1950s when some European artists started to make the symbols and products of the world of advertising and propaganda the main subject of their artistic work. This return of figurative art, in opposition to the abstract expressionism that dominated the aesthetic scene since the end of World War II was dominated by Great Britain until the early 1960s when Andy Warhol, the most known artist of this movement began to show Pop Art in galleries in the United States.

Fashion 

The 1950s saw the birth of the teenager and with it rock n roll and youth fashion dominating the fashion industry. In the UK the Teddy boy became both style icons and anti-authoritarian figures. While in America Greasers had a similar social position. Previously teenagers dressed similarly to their parents but now a rebellious and different youth style was being developed. This was particularly noticeable in the overtly sexual nature of their dress. Men wore tight trousers, leather jackets and emphasis was on slicked, greasy hair.

New ideas meant new designers who had a concept of what was fashion. Fashion started gaining a voice and style when Christian Dior created “The New Look” collection. The 1950s was not only about spending on luxurious brands but also the idea of being comfortable was created. It was a time where resources were available and it was a new type of fashion. Designers were creating collections with different materials such as: taffeta, nylon, rayon, wool and leather that allowed different colors and patterns. People started wearing artificial fibers because it was easier to take care of and it was price effective. It was a time where shopping was part of a lifestyle.

Different designers emerged or made a comeback on the 1950s because as mention before it was a time for fashion and ideas. The most important designers from the time were:

Christian Dior: everything started in 1947 after World War II was over. Christian Dior found that there were a lot of resources in the market. He created the famous and inspirational collection named “The New Look.” This consisted on the idea of creating voluminous dresses that would not only represent wealth but also show power on women. This collection was the first collection to use 80 yards of fabric. He introduced the idea of the hourglass shape for women; wide shoulders, tight waistline and then voluminous full skirts. Dior was a revolutionary and he was the major influence for the next collections. He is known for always developing new ideas and designs, which led to a rapid expansion and becoming worldwide known. He had pressure to create innovative designs for each collection and Dior did manage to provide that to the consumers. He not only made the hourglass shape very famous but he also developed the H-line as well as the A and Y-Lines. Dior was a very important designer, he changed the way fashion was looked on the world but most importantly he reestablished Paris as a fashion capital.

Cristobal Balenciaga: Cristobal Balenciaga a Spanish designer who opened his first couture house in 1915. In 1936, he went to Paris in order to avoid the Spanish Civil War, there he had inspiration for his fashion collections. His designs were an inspiration for emerging designers of the time. His legacy is as important as the one from Dior, revolutionaries. He was known for creating sack dresses, heavy volumes and balloon skirts. For him everything started when he worked for Marquesa de Casa Torre who became his patron and main source of inspiration. Marquesa de Casa Torre helped Balenciaga enter the world of couture. His first suit was very dramatic. The suit consisted on cutout and cut-ins the waist over a slim skirt, something not seen before. Balenciaga was a revolutionary designer who was not afraid to cut and let loose because he had everything under control. In the 1950s and 1960s his designs were well known for attention to color and texture. He was creating different silhouettes for women, in 1955 he created the tunic, 1957 the sack dress and 1958 the Empire styles. He was known for moving from tailored designs to shapeless allowing him to show portion and balance on the bodies. Showing that his designs evolved with time and maintained his ideologies.

Coco Chanel: Her style was well known over the world and her idea of having functional luxurious clothing influenced other designers from the era. Chanel believed that luxurious should come from being comfortable that is why her designers were so unique and different from the time period, she also achieved her looks by adding accessories such as pearl necklaces. Chanel believed that even though Dior designs were revolutionary for the time period they did not managed to represent the women of the time. She believed women had to wear something to represent their survival to another war and their active roles in society. Coming back from a closed house of fashion was not easy for Chanel and competing against younger designers. The Chanel suit was known as a status symbol for wealthy and powerful women. Chanel influenced over the years and her brand is still one of the most influential brands for fashion.

Sports 

 Inaugural season of Formula One

Olympics 
 1952 Summer Olympics held in Helsinki, Finland
 1952 Winter Olympics held in Oslo, Norway
 1956 Summer Olympics held in Melbourne, Australia
 1956 Winter Olympics held in Cortina d'Ampezzo, Italy

FIFA World Cups 
 1950 World Cup hosted by Brazil, won by Uruguay
 1954 World Cup hosted by Switzerland, won by West Germany
 1958 World Cup hosted by Sweden, won by Brazil

The 1958 World Cup is notable for marking the debut on the world stage of a then largely unknown 17-year-old Pelé.

People

Politics 
 Aleksey Innokentevich Antonov, Chief of General Staff of the Unified Armed Forces Warsaw Treaty Organization
 Eugene R. Black, President World Bank
 William Sterling Cole, Director-general International Atomic Energy Agency
 Manuel Fraga Iribarne, Secretary-general Latin Union
 André François-Poncet, Chairman of the Standing Commission International Red Cross and Red Crescent Movement
 Louis Goffin, Secretary-general Western European Union
 Walter Hallstein, President of the European Commission
 Fritz Hess, Director Universal Postal Union
 Ivan Stepanovich Konev, Commander-in-chief of the Unified Armed Forces Warsaw Treaty Organization
 Henri St. Leger, Secretary-general International Organization for Standardization
 Robert C. Lonati, Secretary-general World Tourism Organization
 David A. Morse, Director-general International Labour Organization
 Arnold Duncan McNair, Baron McNair, President of the European Court of Human Rights
 Ove Nielsen, Secretary-general International Maritime Organization
 Maurice Pate, Executive Director United Nations Children's Fund
 Robert Schuman, President of the European Parliamentary Assembly
 Gustav Swoboda, Chief of the Secretariat World Meteorological Organization
 José Guillermo Trabanino Guerrero, Secretary-general Organization of Central American States
 Eric Wyndham White, Executive Secretary World Trade Organization

Actors and entertainers 

 Abbott and Costello
 Julie Adams
 Eddie Albert
 Jack Albertson
 Steve Allen
 June Allyson
 Dev Anand
 Desi Arnaz
 James Arness
 Edward Arnold
 Fred Astaire
 Gene Autry
 Richard Attenborough
 Lauren Bacall
 Carroll Baker
 Lucille Ball
 Martin Balsam
 Anne Bancroft
 Brigitte Bardot
 Richard Basehart
 Anne Baxter
 Harry Belafonte
 Jean-Paul Belmondo
 Jack Benny
 Milton Berle
 Ingrid Bergman
 Charles Bickford
 Vivian Blaine
 Robert Blake
 Ann Blyth
 Richard Boone
 Stephen Boyd
 Ray Bolger
 Dirk Bogarde
 Humphrey Bogart
 Ernest Borgnine
 Marlon Brando
 Walter Brennan
 Lloyd Bridges
 Charles Bronson
 Mel Brooks
 Lenny Bruce
 Yul Brynner
 Edgar Buchanan
 Richard Burton
 George Burns
 Raymond Burr
 Sid Caesar
 James Cagney
 Rory Calhoun
 Claudia Cardinale
 Yvonne De Carlo
 Leslie Caron
 Art Carney
 John Carradine
 Diahann Carroll
 Johnny Carson
 John Cassavetes
 Jeff Chandler
 Carol Channing
 Charlie Chaplin
 Cyd Charisse
 Lee Van Cleef
 Montgomery Clift
 Rosemary Clooney
 Lee J. Cobb
 Claudette Colbert
 Nat "King" Cole
 Joan Collins
 Sean Connery
 Gary Cooper
 William Conrad
 Joseph Cotten
 Jeanne Crain
 Joan Crawford
 Bing Crosby
 Tony Curtis
 Peter Cushing
 Robert Cummings
 Arlene Dahl
 Dorothy Dandridge
 Danielle Darrieux
 Linda Darnell
 Bette Davis
 Nancy Davis
 Sammy Davis Jr.
 Doris Day
 James Dean
 Ruby Dee
 Sandra Dee
 William Demarest
 Richard Denning
 Brandon deWilde
 Angie Dickinson
 Marlene Dietrich
 Troy Donahue
 Mamie Van Doren
 Diana Dors
 Bobby Driscoll
 Kirk Douglas
 Clint Eastwood 
 Barbara Eden
 Anita Ekberg
 María Félix
 Mel Ferrer
 José Ferrer
 Peter Finch
 Barry Fitzgerald
 Rhonda Fleming
 Jo Van Fleet
 Errol Flynn
 Nina Foch
 Henry Fonda
 Joan Fontaine
 John Forsythe
 Glenn Ford
 Anne Francis
 William Frawley
 Annette Funicello
 Louis de Funès
 Clark Gable
 Eva Gabor
 Zsa Zsa Gabor
 Ava Gardner
 James Garner
 Judy Garland
 Vittorio Gassman
 John Gielgud
 Lillian Gish
 Jackie Gleason
 Paulette Goddard
 Betty Grable
 Gloria Grahame
 Cary Grant
 Farley Granger
 Stewart Granger
 Kathryn Grayson
 Lorne Greene
 John Gregson
 Virginia Grey
 Alec Guinness
 Edmund Gwenn
 Tony Hancock
 Julie Harris
 Rex Harrison
 Laurence Harvey
 Olivia de Havilland
 Sterling Hayden
 Helen Hayes
 Susan Hayward
 Rita Hayworth
 Van Heflin
 Audrey Hepburn
 Katharine Hepburn
 Charlton Heston
 William Holden
 Judy Holliday
 Stanley Holloway
 James Hong
 Dennis Hopper
 Bob Hope
 Rock Hudson
 Jeffrey Hunter
 Tab Hunter
 Burl Ives
 Pedro Infante
 John Ireland
 Anne Jeffreys
 Van Johnson
 Glynis Johns
 Carolyn Jones
 Jennifer Jones
 Shirley Jones
 Katy Jurado
 Boris Karloff
 Danny Kaye
 Howard Keel
 Brian Keith
 Gene Kelly
 Grace Kelly
 Deborah Kerr
 Eartha Kitt
 Jack Klugman
 Don Knotts
 Dilip Kumar
 Kishore Kumar
 Meena Kumari
 Alan Ladd
 Burt Lancaster
 Angela Lansbury
 Piper Laurie
 Peter Lawford
 Cloris Leachman
 Christopher Lee
 Ruta Lee
 Janet Leigh
 Jack Lemmon
 Jerry Lewis
 Norman Lloyd
 June Lockhart
 Gina Lollobrigida
 Julie London
 Sophia Loren
 Peter Lorre
 Jack Lord
 Ida Lupino
 Darren McGavin
 Gordon MacRae
 Fred MacMurray
 Shirley MacLaine
 Jayne Mansfield
 Karl Malden
 Dorothy Malone
 Jean Marais
 Fredric March
 Dean Martin
 Lee Marvin
 Groucho Marx
 Giulietta Masina
 James Mason
 Marcello Mastroianni
 Jerry Mathers
 Walter Matthau
 Victor Mature
 Virginia Mayo
 Joel McCrea
 Dorothy McGuire
 John McIntire
 Steve McQueen
 Audrey Meadows
 Jayne Meadows
 Ralph Meeker
 Adolphe Menjou
 Burgess Meredith
 Toshiro Mifune
 Ray Milland
 John Mills
 Vera Miles
 Sal Mineo
 Carmen Miranda
 Cameron Mitchel
 Robert Mitchum
 Marilyn Monroe
 Yves Montand
 Ricardo Montalbán
 Agnes Moorehead
 Elizabeth Montgomery
 Roger Moore
 Jeanne Moreau
 Rita Moreno
 Harry Morgan
 Vic Morrow
 Audie Murphy
 Don Murray
 Patricia Neal
 Jorge Negrete
 Ricky Nelson
 Paul Newman
 Barbara Nichols
 Leslie Nielsen
 David Niven
 Kim Novak
 Edmond O'Brien
 Donald O'Connor
 Maureen O'Hara
 Maureen O'Sullivan
 Laurence Olivier
 Geraldine Page
 Janis Paige
 Eleanor Parker
 Jack Palance
 Gregory Peck
 George Peppard
 Anthony Perkins
 Jean Peters
 Donald Pleasence
 Christopher Plummer
 Sidney Poitier
 Dick Powell
 Jane Powell
 Tyrone Power
 Elvis Presley
 Robert Preston
 Vincent Price
 Jon Provost
 Anthony Quinn
 Tony Randall
 Ronald Reagan
 Donna Reed
 George Reeves
 Steve Reeves
 Carl Reiner
 Tommy Rettig
 Debbie Reynolds
 Thelma Ritter
 Jason Robards
 Cliff Robertson
 Edward G. Robinson
 Ginger Rogers
 Roy Rogers
 Cesar Romero
 Mickey Rooney
 Barbara Rush
 Jane Russell
 Rosalind Russell
 Eva Marie Saint
 George Sanders
 John Saxon
 Maximilian Schell
 Romy Schneider
 Gordon Scott
 Lizabeth Scott
 Randolph Scott
 Peter Sellers
 Omar Sharif
 Dinah Shore
 Takashi Shimura
 Vittorio De Sica
 Simone Signoret
 Jean Simmons
 Frank Sinatra
 Red Skelton
 Ann Sothern
 Alberto Sordi
 Robert Stack
 Kim Stanley
 Barbara Stanwyck
 Rod Steiger
 Jan Sterling
 James Stewart
 Dean Stockwell
 Lewis Stone
 Woody Strode
 Barry Sullivan
 Ed Sullivan
 Max von Sydow
 Lyle Talbot
 Russ Tamblyn
 Elizabeth Taylor
 Robert Taylor
 Rod Taylor
 Gene Tierney
 Spencer Tracy
 Lana Turner
 Vivian Vance
 Robert Wagner
 Eli Wallach
 John Wayne
 Jack Webb
 Orson Welles
 Betty White
 Stuart Whitman
 James Whitmore
 Richard Widmark
 Esther Williams
 Marie Windsor
 Shelley Winters
 Natalie Wood
 Joanne Woodward
 Teresa Wright
 Jane Wyman
 Keenan Wynn
 Loretta Young
 Robert Young
 Efrem Zimbalist Jr.

Filmmakers 

 Michelangelo Antonioni
 Mario Bava
 Ingmar Bergman
 Luis Buñuel
 Jean Cocteau
 Luigi Comencini
 Charles Crichton
 George Cukor
 Michael Curtiz
 Jean Delannoy
 Walt Disney
 Stanley Donen
 Blake Edwards
 Federico Fellini
 Richard Fleischer
 John Frankenheimer
 John Ford
 Lucio Fulci
 Pietro Germi
 Jean-Luc Godard
 Henry Hathaway
 Howard Hawks
 Alfred Hitchcock
 Howard Hughes
 John Huston
 Elia Kazan
 Keisuke Kinoshita
 Stanley Kubrick
 Akira Kurosawa
 Fritz Lang
 David Lean
 Anthony Mann
 Joseph L. Mankiewicz
 Jean-Pierre Melville
 Kenji Mizoguchi
 Mario Monicelli
 Yasujirō Ozu
 Otto Preminger
 Nicholas Ray
 Dino Risi
 Jacques Rivette
 Roberto Rossellini
 Vittorio De Sica
 Don Siegel
 J. Lee Thompson
 Andrzej Wajda
 Orson Welles
 Billy Wilder
 Robert Wise
 William Wyler

Musicians 

 Black Ace
 Buddy Ace
 Johnny Ace
 Arthur Alexander
 Lee Allen
 Gene Allison
 Marian Anderson
 Pink Anderson
 Paul Anka
 Louis Armstrong
 Eddy Arnold
 Chet Atkins
 Gene Autry
 Frankie Avalon
 Charles Aznavour
 LaVern Baker
 Pearl Bailey
 Hank Ballard
 Bobby Bare
 Count Basie
 Sidney Bechet
 Harry Belafonte
 Jesse Belvin
 Tex Beneke
 Boyd Bennett
 Tony Bennett
 Chuck Berry
 Richard Berry
 Bill Black
 Otis Blackwell
 Scrapper Blackwell
 Blind Blake
 Art Blakey
 Bobby Bland
 Johnny Bond
 Pat Boone
 The Big Bopper
 Jimmy Bowen
 Calvin Boze
 Jackie Brenston
 Teresa Brewer
 Big Bill Broonzy
 Charles Brown
 Clarence "Gatemouth" Brown
 James Brown
 Nappy Brown
 Roy Brown
 Ruth Brown
 Tommy Brown
 Dave Brubeck
 Jimmy Bryant
 Sonny Burgess
 Solomon Burke
 Johnny Burnette
 James Burton
 Sam Butera
 Erskine Butterfield
 Maria Callas
 Cab Calloway
 Glen Campbell
 Martha Carson
 Goree Carter
 Johnny Cash
 Bobby Charles
 Ray Charles
 Boozoo Chavis
 Chubby Checker
 Clifton Chenier
 June Christy
 Eugene Church
 Dee Clark
 Petula Clark
 Joe Clay
 Jack Clement
 Patsy Cline
 Rosemary Clooney
 Eddie Cochran
 Nat "King" Cole
 John Coltrane
 Perry Como
 James Cotton
 Floyd Council
 Pee Wee Crayton
 Bing Crosby
 Bob Crosby
 Gary Crosby
 Arthur Crudup
 Mac Curtis
 Dick Dale
 Dick Dale (singer)
 Dalida
 Bobby Darin
 Hal David
 Jimmie Davis
 Miles Davis
 Sammy Davis Jr.
 Bobby Day
 Doris Day
 Bo Diddley
 Willie Dixon
 Carl Dobkins Jr.
 Bill Doggett
 Fats Domino
 Lonnie Donegan
 Jimmy Dorsey
 Lee Dorsey
 Tommy Dorsey
 K. C. Douglas
 Rusty Draper
 Champion Jack Dupree
 Jimmy Durante
 Leroy Van Dyke
 Jack Earls
 Duke Ellington
 Billy "The Kid" Emerson
 Werly Fairburn
 Charlie Feathers
 H-Bomb Ferguson
 Eddie Fisher
 Sonny Fisher
 Toni Fisher
 Ella Fitzgerald
 Mary Ford
 Tennessee Ernie Ford
 Helen Forrest
 Connie Francis
 Alan Freed
 Ernie Freeman
 Frank Frost
 Johnny Fuller
 Billy Fury
 Earl Gaines
 Hank Garland
 Judy Garland
 Clarence Garlow
 Georgia Gibbs
 Dizzy Gillespie
 Dick Glasser
 Arthur Godfrey
 Benny Goodman
 Roscoe Gordon
 Eydie Gormé
 Charlie Gracie
 Gogi Grant
 Jack Guthrie
 Roy Hamilton
 Lionel Hampton
 Pat Hare
 Slim Harpo
 Homer Harris
 Peppermint Harris
 Wynonie Harris
 Hawkshaw Hawkins
 Screamin' Jay Hawkins
 Al Hibbler
 Chuck Higgins
 Earl Hines
 Silas Hogan
 Smokey Hogg
 Ron Holden
 Billie Holiday
 Buddy Holly
 John Lee Hooker
 Lightnin' Hopkins
 Lena Horne
 Johnny Horton
 David Houston
 Joe Houston
 Ivory Joe Hunter
 Tab Hunter
 Burl Ives
 Bull Moose Jackson
 Mahalia Jackson
 Elmore James
 Etta James
 Harry James
 Homesick James
 Joni James
 Sonny James
 Waylon Jennings
 Kris Jensen
 Dr. John
 Little Willie John
 Hank Jones
 Jimmy Jones
 Louis Jordan
 Don Julian
 Kitty Kallen
 Chris Kenner
 Anita Kerr
 Albert King
 B.B. King
 Ben E. King
 Earl King
 Freddie King
 Pee Wee King
 Saunders King
 Eartha Kitt
 Christine Kittrell
 Baker Knight
 Sonny Knight
 Buddy Knox
 Gene Krupa
 Frankie Laine
 Major Lance
 Mario Lanza
 Ellis Larkins
 Brenda Lee
 Dickie Lee
 Peggy Lee
 Lazy Lester
 Jerry Lee Lewis
 Smiley Lewis
 Little Willie Littlefield
 Julie London
 Joe Hill Louis
 Willie Love
 Robin Luke
 Frankie Lymon
 Loretta Lynn
 Carl Mann
 Dean Martin
 Grady Martin
 Janis Martin
 Johnny Mathis
 Jimmy McCracklin
 Skeets McDonald
 Big Jay McNeely
 Clyde McPhatter
 Max Merritt
 Big Maceo Merriweather
 Amos Milburn
 Chuck Miller
 Mitch Miller
 Ned Miller
 Roy Milton
 Garnet Mimms
 Charles Mingus
 Carmen Miranda
 Bobby Mitchell
 Guy Mitchell
 Thelonious Monk
 Bill Monroe
 Vaughn Monroe
 Wes Montgomery
 Benny Moré
 Moon Mullican
 Rose Murphy
 Jimmy Nelson
 Ricky Nelson
 Sandy Nelson
 Robert Nighthawk
 Willie Nix
 Jimmy Nolen
 Nervous Norvus
 Donald O'Conner
 St. Louis Jimmy Oden
 Odetta
 Gene O'Quin
 Roy Orbison
 Johnny Otis
 Patti Page
 Charlie Parker
 Junior Parker
 Dolly Parton
 Les Paul
 Art Pepper
 Carl Perkins
 Oscar Peterson
 Phil Phillips
 Sam Phillips
 Édith Piaf
 Webb Pierce
 Gene Pitney
 Pérez Prado
 Elvis Presley
 Jimmy Preston
 Johnny Preston
 Lloyd Price
 Ray Price
 Louis Prima
 Johnnie Ray
 Tampa Red
 Jerry Reed
 Jimmy Reed
 Della Reese
 Django Reinhardt
 Slim Rhodes
 Buddy Rich
 Charlie Rich
 Cliff Richard
 Little Richard
 Tommy Ridgley
 Billy Lee Riley
 Tex Ritter
 Johnny Rivers
 Max Roach
 Marty Robbins
 Jimmie Rodgers
 Arsenio Rodríguez
 Kenny Rogers
 Bobby Rydell
 Kyu Sakamoto
 Washboard Sam
 Tommy Sands
 Mabel Scott
 Neil Sedaka
 Pete Seeger
 Johnny Shines
 Dinah Shore
 Frank Sinatra
 Memphis Slim
 Sunnyland Slim
 Huey "Piano" Smith
 Ray Smith
 Warren Smith
 Hank Snow
 Kay Starr
 Joan Sutherland
 Art Tatum
 Jesse Thomas
 Rufus Thomas
 Hank Thompson
 Big Mama Thornton
 Johnny Tillotson
 Merle Travis
 Ernest Tubb
 Big Joe Turner
 Ike Turner
 Sammy Turner
 Conway Twitty
 Ritchie Valens
 Sarah Vaughan
 Bobby Vee
 Gene Vincent
 T-Bone Walker
 Little Walter
 Mercy Dee Walton
 Baby Boy Warren
 Dinah Washington
 Muddy Waters
 Johnny "Guitar" Watson
 Joe Weaver
 Ben Webster
 Lenny Welch
 Speedy West
 Josh White
 Slim Whitman
 Andy Williams
 Big Joe Williams
 Cootie Williams
 Hank Williams
 Larry Williams
 Otis Williams
 Tex Williams
 Ralph Willis
 Bob Wills
 Howlin' Wolf
 Malcolm Yelvington
 Faron Young
 Johnny "Man" Young
 Timi Yuro

Bands 

 The Accents
 Jay & The Americans
 The Ames Brothers
 The Andrews Sisters
 Dave Appell & the Applejacks
 The Bell Notes
 The Belmonts
 Dion & The Belmonts
 Travis & Bob
 The Bobbettes
 The Bonnie Sisters
 The Bosstones
 The Buchanan Brothers
 The Cadets
 The Cadillacs
 The Capris
 The Cardinals
 The Castells
 The Champs
 The Chantels
 The Charioteers
 Otis Williams and the Charms
 The Chimes
 The Chips
 The Chordettes
 The Cleftones
 The Clovers
 The Coasters
 The Collegians
 Bill Haley and the Comets
 The Corsairs
 The Counts
 The Crew Cuts
 The Crescendos
 The Crests
 The Crows
 Danny & the Juniors
 Jan & Dean
 The Dells
 The Del-Satins
 The Delta Rhythm Boys
 The Del-Vikings
 Deep River Boys
 The Dovells
 The Dubs
 The Duprees
 The Diamonds
 The Drifters
 The Earls
 The Echoes
 The Edsels
 The El Dorados
 The Elegants
 The Emotions
 The Escorts
 The Everly Brothers
 The Fairfield Four
 The Falcons
 The Flamingos
 The Flairs
 The Fleetwoods
 The Fiestas
 The Five Satins
 The Five Discs
 The Five Keys
 The Five Sharps
 The Fontane Sisters
 The Four Aces
 The Four Buddies
 The Four Freshmen
 The Four Knights
 The Four Lads
 The Four Lovers
 The Four Preps
 The Four Seasons
 The Four Tunes
 The Gaylords
 The G-Clefs
 The Golden Gate Quartet
 The Harptones
 The Hearts
 The Heathertones
 The Hilltoppers
 The Hollywood Flames
 Johnny & The Hurricanes
 The Impalas
 Little Anthony and the Imperials
 The Ink Spots
 The Isley Brothers
 The Jewels
 The Jesters
 The Jive Bombers
 The Jive Five
 Marvin & Johnny
 Robert & Johnny
 Don & Juan
 The Jubalaires
 The Jordanaires
 The Kingston Trio
 The Knockouts
 The Larks
 The Lettermen
 Frankie Lymon & The Teenagers
 The McGuire Sisters
 The Medallions
 The Mello-Kings
 The Mello-Moods
 The Mills Brothers
 The Midnighters
 The Monotones
 The Moonglows
 The Mystics
 The Nutmegs
 The Oak Ridge Boys
 The Orioles
 The Paragons
 The Penguins
 The Pied Pipers
 The Platters
 The Pony-Tails
 The Quarrymen
 The Quotations
 Randy & The Rainbows
 The Ravens
 The Rays
 The Regents
 The Righteous Brothers
 Norman Fox & The Rob-Roys
 The Robins
 The Rock-A-Teens
 The Sensations
 The Shadows
 The Shepherd Sisters
 The Silhouettes
 The Solitaires
 Sons of The Pioneers
 The Spaniels
 The Sparkletones
 The Spiders
 The Spinners
 Joey Dee & The Starliters
 The Stereos
 The Swallows
 Mickey & Sylvia
 Tátrai Quartet
 The Teenagers
 The Teen Queens
 The Tokens
 The Tornados
 The Turbans
 The Tymes
 The Valentines
 The Ventures
 The Virtues
 The Volumes
 Billy Ward & The Dominoes
 The Wrens
 Maurice Williams and the Zodiacs
 Windsbacher Knabenchor

Sports figures 

 Hank Aaron (baseball player)
 Ernie Banks (baseball player)
 Roger Bannister (English track and field athlete)
 Carmen Basilio (boxing|boxer)
 Yogi Berra (baseball player)
 József Bozsik
 Jim Brown (American football player)
 László Budai
 Jenő Buzánszky
 Roy Campanella (baseball player)
 Ezzard Charles (boxer)
 Maureen Connolly (tennis player)
 Bob Cousy (basketball player)
 Zoltán Czibor
 Joe DiMaggio (baseball player)
 Harrison Dillard (American track and field athlete)
 Larry Doby (baseball player)
 Juan Manuel Fangio (motor racing driver)
 Nino Farina (motor racing driver)
 Whitey Ford (baseball player)
 Gyula Grosics
 Nándor Hidegkuti
 Ben Hogan (golf)
 Gordie Howe (Canadian ice hockey player)
 Rafer Johnson (American track and field athlete)
 Ingemar Johansson (boxer)
 Al Kaline (baseball player)
 Sándor Kocsis
 John Landy (Australian track and field athlete)
 Mihály Lantos
 Gyula Lóránt
 Mickey Mantle (baseball player)
 Rocky Marciano (boxer)
 Billy Martin (baseball player)
 Eddie Mathews (baseball player)
 Stanley Matthews (association footballer)
 Willie Mays (baseball player)
 George Mikan (basketball player)
 Stirling Moss (motor racing driver)
 Archie Moore (boxer)
 Stan Musial (baseball player)
 Bobo Olson (boxer)
 Floyd Patterson (boxer)
 Pelé (association footballer)
 Bob Pettit
 Ferenc Puskás (association footballer)
 Maurice Richard (Canadian ice hockey player)
 Jackie Robinson (baseball player)
 Frank Robinson (baseball player)
 Sugar Ray Robinson (boxer)
 Wilma Rudolph
 Bill Russell (basketball player)
 Sam Snead (golf)
 Duke Snider (baseball player)
 Warren Spahn (baseball player)
 Casey Stengel (baseball manager, former player)
 Chuck Taylor
 Johnny Unitas (American football player)
 Mal Whitfield (American track and field athlete)
 Ted Williams (baseball player)
 Billy Wright (association footballer)
 Lev Yashin (association footballer)
 József Zakariás
 Emil Zátopek

See also 

 1950s in television
 1950s in literature
 Post-World War II boom
 1950s American automobile culture

Timeline 
The following articles contain brief timelines which list the most prominent events of the decade:

1950 • 1951 • 1952 • 1953 • 1954 • 1955 • 1956 • 1957 • 1958 • 1959

References

Further reading 
 Bessel, Richard and Dirk Schumann, eds. Life after Death: Approaches to a Cultural and Social History of Europe During the 1940s and 1950s (2003), essays by scholars on recovery from the war
 Judt, Tony. Postwar: A History of Europe Since 1945 (2005)
 London Institute of World Affairs, The Year Book of World Affairs 1957 (London 1957), comprehensive reference book covering 1956 in diplomacy, international affairs and politics for major nations and regions

Great Britain 
 Montgomery, John. The Fifties (1960), On Britain.
 Sandbrook, Dominic. Never had it so good: a history of Britain from Suez to the Beatles Hachette UK, (2015).
 Bering, Henrik. "Taking the great out of Britain." Policy Review, no. 133, (2005), p. 88+. online review
 Wybrow, Robert J. "Britain Speaks Out, 1937-87" (1989), Summaries of public opinion polls in Britain

United States 
 Dunar, Andrew J. America in the fifties (2006)
 Halberstam, David. The Fifties (1993) excerpt and text search
 Levine, Alan J. The Myth of the 1950s (2008) excerpt and text search
 Marling, Karal Ann. As Seen on TV: The Visual Culture of Everyday Life in the 1950s (Harvard University Press, 1996) 328 pp.
 Miller, Douglas T. and Marion Nowak. The fifties: the way we really were (1977)
 Stoner, John C., and Alice L. George. Social History of the United States: The 1950s (2008)
 Wills, Charles. America in the 1950s (Decades of American History) (2005)

External links 

 Heroes of the 1950s – slideshow by Life magazine
 
 Footage from the 1950s
 1950s Video Timeline

 
20th century
1950s decade overviews